Strategic goal may be:

 Strategic goal (business)
 Strategic goal (military)